Christopher Ryan Conner (born December 23, 1983) is an American professional ice hockey winger. He is currently an unrestricted free agent who most recently played for the Binghamton Devils of the American Hockey League (AHL).

Early life
Conner grew up in Westland, Michigan and attended Churchill High School in Livonia, Michigan. He lived in the same neighbourhood as current Anaheim Ducks forward Ryan Kesler, and the two grew up together playing hockey since childhood. As a youth, he played in the 1997 Quebec International Pee-Wee Hockey Tournament with the Detroit Little Caesars minor ice hockey team.

Playing career
Undrafted, Chris Conner played four seasons of collegiate hockey for Michigan Tech of the WCHA from 2002 to 2006. One of his teammates there was John Scott, who would also play in the NHL. After his senior year, Conner made his professional debut with the Iowa Stars of the AHL at the end of the 2005–06 season.

On July 13, 2006, Conner signed as a free agent to a two-year contract with the Dallas Stars. Conner was then assigned to affiliate Iowa for the start of the 2006–07 season, but upon being recalled, scored his first NHL goal during a game against the Colorado Avalanche on December 27, 2006. Conner was re-signed by the Stars at the end of the 2007–08 season to a one-year deal on March 12, 2008.

After splitting the 2008–09 season between the Stars and the Peoria Rivermen, Conner signed a one-year deal with Pittsburgh Penguins on July 7, 2009. Conner appeared in 60 games during the 2010–11 NHL season with Pittsburgh, scoring seven goals with nine assists. He scored the Penguins second goal in an 8–2 loss in Game 5 of Pittsburgh's first-round series against the Tampa Bay Lightning. Conner failed to convert on a penalty shot during the second period of the next game, losing the puck off his stick as he advanced towards Lightning goaltender Dwayne Roloson. Pittsburgh ultimately lost the series in seven games.

On July 7, 2011, Conner signed a one-year, two-way contract with the Detroit Red Wings.

In the following 2012–13 season, Conner signed with the Phoenix Coyotes on a one-year contract. With the lockout in effect, he was directly assigned to the AHL affiliate, the Portland Pirates. He was recalled by the Coyotes to help their playoff push, appearing in 12 games to score 2 points, before being returned to Portland before the end of their season.

On July 5, 2013, Conner signed a one-year, two-way contract to return with the Pittsburgh Penguins that was to pay him $550,000 at the NHL level.

On July 1, 2014, Conner continued his journeyman career in signing a one-year two-way contract with the Washington Capitals. A year later Conner signed a two-year, two-way contract with the Philadelphia Flyers. He led the scoring in the Flyers' AHL affiliate Lehigh Valley Phantoms during the 2015-16 season with 55 points.

As a free agent following the completion of his contract with the Flyers, Conner opted to continue his tenure with the Phantoms in agreeing to a two-year AHL deal on July 6, 2017.

After four seasons with the Phantoms, Conner left the club as a free agent, continuing in the AHL in securing a one-year contract with the Binghamton Devils, affiliate to the New Jersey Devils, on July 17, 2019.

Career statistics

Awards and honors

References

External links

 Pens Universe interviews Chris Conner

1983 births
Living people
American men's ice hockey right wingers
Binghamton Devils players
Dallas Stars players
Detroit Red Wings players
Grand Rapids Griffins players
Hershey Bears players
Ice hockey players from Michigan
Iowa Stars players
Lehigh Valley Phantoms players
Michigan Tech Huskies men's ice hockey players
People from Westland, Michigan
Peoria Rivermen (AHL) players
Phoenix Coyotes players
Pittsburgh Penguins players
Portland Pirates players
Undrafted National Hockey League players
Washington Capitals players
Wilkes-Barre/Scranton Penguins players